David M. Labrava (born October 19, 1962) is an American actor, writer, tattoo artist, former member of the Hells Angels, and motorcycle enthusiast known for playing Happy Lowman in the FX series Sons of Anarchy and its spinoff Mayans M.C..

Early life
Labrava was born in Miami, Florida, and spent time in Amsterdam tattooing and working as a bouncer at a club. He grew up riding dirt bikes and got his first Harley Davidson when he was 17. At the age of 14, he was cooking chicharrón with Cubans in Hialeah, Florida.

Career
Labrava was hired to be the Technical Advisor for Sons of Anarchy and then was cast as Happy Lowman; he was with the show from its inception in 2008 to its finale in 2014. He also co-wrote season 4, episode 10, titled "Hands", the only episode in seven seasons that ever won an award, an honorable mention from Time magazine.

Labrava has authored a best selling autobiography, entitled Becoming A Son.

Labrava wrote, produced, directed, and starred in his first feature film, entitled Street Level (2015), which is available on digital platforms.

Labrava writes the "Burnin' Rubber with Jimmy Carbone" column in the national hot rod magazine, Ol' Skool Rodz. He is credited as Dave "D.L." Labrava. Before that he used to write for The Horse motorcycle magazine and built a bike that made the cover in March 2001.

Personal life
Labrava resides in Oakland, California, with his dogs. He practices Buddhism.

His son Tycho committed suicide on May 5, 2018, at the age of 16. There had previously been no outward signs of depression or any other mental health issues. Labrava wrote on Instagram, "I am broken", and encouraged his followers to communicate with their loved ones, because "there may not be any signs."

Legal trouble
Labrava was arrested in 2008 in Missoula County, Montana, for two felony counts of possession of marijuana and two misdemeanor counts for possession of paraphernalia. A search warrant was obtained for his hotel room after a woman reported he had held her there against her will. After the search warrant was executed, 1.5 grams of hashish was found in the room as well as a pipe.

Filmography

References

External links
 
 

1962 births
American Buddhists
American male television actors
American tattoo artists
Hells Angels
Living people
Male actors from Miami